Interstate 294 (I-294) is a tolled auxiliary Interstate Highway in the northeastern part of the U.S. state of Illinois. Forming the southern portion of the Tri-State Tollway in Illinois, I-294 runs from South Holland at I-80/I-94 and Illinois Route 394 (IL 394) to Northbrook at I-94. It serves as a bypass around the city of Chicago. I-294 is also the longest auxiliary route of I-94, at  longer than I-494 in Minneapolis–Saint Paul. In addition, the tollway is the longest auxiliary Interstate Highway in Illinois, and it intersects the most primary Interstate Highways at six.

Route description
I-294 begins at the interchange between I-94, I-80, and IL 394 in Lansing. I-94 splits off toward Chicago while I-80/I-294 heads west as an eight-lane tollway and crosses above a railroad track and Thorn Creek in Thornton. The highway crosses under the Chicago Southland Lincoln Oasis, Chicago Road, another railroad track, and State Street through residential areas. I-80/I-294 is between the Thornton Quarry on an elevated area before crossing the quarry on a bridge and passing under another railroad track. The highway then enters East Hazel Crest and has a cloverleaf interchange with IL 1 (Halsted Street) and widens to 10 lanes. Then, I-80/I-294 reenters the residential areas and center cross over Center Avenue, the Canadian National Railway Chicago Subdivision, the Metra electric line, and the Dixie Highway. After crossing under 171st Street, I-80 splits off and heads toward Des Moines, Iowa, and I-294 narrows to eight lanes in Hazel Crest.

After the I-80 split, I-294 heads north and enters Markham. It crosses under 167th Street and goes through the 163rd Street toll plaza. I-294 has a cloverleaf interchange with US Route 6 (US 6; 159th Street) and turns northwest toward an incomplete interchange with I-57. I-294 then enters Posen and has a partial interchange with IL 83 (147th Street). I-294 turns west to cross the Metra Rock Island District and Kedzie Avenue. I-294 turns northwest, and enters Midlothian. It crosses over South Claire Boulevard, Pulaski Road, the Midlothian Turnpike, 135th Street, and the Calumet River. I-294 has an interchange with IL 50 and IL 83 (Cicero Avenue) with a northbound exit and southbound entrance via 127th Street in Alsip. It then passes by warehouses and crosses over Ridgeland Avenue, 115th Street, 111th Street, 107th Street, another Metra line, Southwest Highway, Stony Creek, all while entering Worth, Chicago Ridge, and Bridgeview. The tollway enters Justice and has another interchange with US 12/US 20 (95th Street) and IL 43 (Harlem Avenue). I-294 then crosses over 87th Street and Roberts Road. It then goes through the 82nd/83rd street toll plaza. It crosses over 88th Avenue and has an interchange with IL 171 (Archer Avenue), US 45, US 12, and US 20 (La Grange Road). I-294 then crosses the Canadian National Railway Joliet Subdivision , the Illinois and Michigan Canal, the Chicago Sanitary and Ship Canal, the Des Plaines River, the BNSF Railway Chillicothe Subdivision, Santa Fe Drive, and an access road on the Mile-Long Bridge. I-294 then enters Indian Head Park and has an interchange with I-55 and Joliet Road and turns north.

I-294 then passes under Plainfield Road, crosses a small creek, crosses under the Hinsdale Oasis, and enters Hinsdale. I-294 passes under 55th Street, 47th Street, the BNSF Railway, and a trail. I-294 then has a cloverleaf interchange with US 34 and enters Oak Brook. I-294 crosses under 31st Street and Cermak Road. I-294 goes through the Cermak Road toll plaza and the Hillside Strangler. It crosses over IL 38 (Roosevelt Road) after the plaza. It enters Hillside and crosses over I-88 and I-290. It then crosses under Saint Charles Road, enters Berkeley, and crosses the Union Pacific Railroad. I-294 enters Northlake and crosses over US 20 (Lake Street), IL 64 (North Avenue), and Grand Avenue. It then takes the Grand Avenue Curve, turning northeast. I-294 crosses over the Union Pacific Railroad and Wolf Road, briefly enters Bensenville, crosses over the Bensenville Railyard of the Canadian Pacific Railway, and US 12/US 45 (Mannheim Road), enters Schiller Park, crosses under the former O'Hare Oasis, and passes by the Irving Park toll plaza (for southbound lanes). It enters the Chicago Panhandle, which connects O'Hare International Airport to the rest of the city. It then enters Rosemont, crossing under Balmoral Avenue and I-190 and crossing over I-90 having an interchange with each of the three previously mentioned roadways.

I-294 enters Des Plaines, passing by the Touhy Avenue toll plaza (for northbound lanes), and crosses over River Road. It then has a partial interchange with Touhy Avenue. I-294 crosses the Des Plaines River, and the Union Pacific Railroad, and enters Park Ridge. I-294 has a partial interchange with US 14 (Dempster Street), enters Glenview, and crosses over Northwest Highway and Ballard Road. It has another partial interchange with IL 58 and crosses over the Union Pacific Railroad, Central Avenue, IL 21 (Milwaukee Avenue), and Lake Avenue. It has a diamond interchange with Willow Road and enters Northbrook. It crosses under Sanders Road and IL 68 (Dundee Road) and crosses over Sanders Road. It enters Deerfield and terminates at a partial interchange with I-94 just south of Lake-Cook Road, the county line, to which I-294 has full access.

History

The portion of the Borman Expressway that was completed from Gary westward and the Kingery Expressway were originally designated as I-80, I-90, and I-294 from shortly after the Interstate Highway program was enacted until about 1965 when the connection between the Borman and the Indiana Toll Road was completed, and I-90 was swapped with I-94 west of that junction (and east of where those routes share the same road in Chicago), cutting back I-294 to its current south terminus (eliminating the Indiana part of I-294).

I-294 was built largely before the growth and maturation of the suburbs that run along the corridor. As a result, the vast majority of the interchanges are partial or were configured to have entrance ramps feeding the toll plazas. Gaps between exit ramps are common, the  gap between Cicero Avenue (IL 50/IL 83) and 95th Street (US 12/US 20) being one of the more notable ones. Partial interchanges are located at Roosevelt Road (IL 38; northbound exit, southbound entrance), Irving Park Road (IL 19) (southbound exit, northbound entrance), Touhy Avenue (northbound exit, southbound entrance), Dempster Street (US 14; northbound exit, southbound entrance), and Golf Road (IL 58; southbound exit, northbound entrance).

From 1992 to 1993, the central portion of I-294 between Balmoral and 95th Street was widened to eight lanes. As part of the project, the 79th Street exit was removed while the 75th Street/Willow Springs Road exit was constructed. It also caused southbound 83rd Street Toll Plaza to relocate north. Several former partial interchanges have been converted to full interchanges, with automated toll collection facilities on the new ramps, such as at 159th Street (US 6; northbound on and southbound off added) and 95th Street (US 12/US 20; southbound on and northbound off added). Between 2006 and 2009, the southern and northern portions of I-294 (IL-394 to 95th Street and I-90 to Lake Cook Road respectively) were fully reconstructed and expanded, bringing the entire highway up to eight lanes.

The Illinois State Toll Highway Authority (ISTHA) and the Illinois Department of Transportation (IDOT) are partnering to construct a new interchange to connect I-294 to I-57. The primary interchange connections between I-294 and I-57 were completed in 2014, while the remaining ramps except for northbound I-57 to southbound I-294 and northbound I-294 to southbound I-57 were completed on September 11, 2022.

The central portion of I-294 between Balmoral Avenue and 95th Street is currently being reconstructed and widened to a five/six-lane cross-section, with the inside shoulder being a flex lane that can be used during emergencies or heavy congestion. The work also includes reconfiguring the interchange with I-88/290. It required the removal of the Hinsdale Oasis. The entire project is scheduled to be completed in 2026.

Exit list

References

External links

 Kurumi's 3di page: Interstate 294
 Illinois Highway Ends: Interstate 294

 
94-2
94-2 Illinois
2
Toll roads in Illinois
Transportation in Cook County, Illinois